Astartea middletonii is a shrub endemic to Western Australia.

The shrub is found in the South West region of Western Australia around Manjimup.

References

Eudicots of Western Australia
middletonii
Endemic flora of Western Australia
Plants described in 2013
Taxa named by Barbara Lynette Rye